Proeulia is a genus of moths belonging to the family Tortricidae.

Species
Proeulia aethalea  Obraztsov, 1964
Proeulia apospasta  Obraztsov, 1964
Proeulia approximata  (Butler, 1883) 
Proeulia auraria  (Clarke, 1949) 
Proeulia boliviae  Razowski, 1988
Proeulia chancoana  Razowski & Pelz, 2010
Proeulia chromaffinis  Razowski, 1995
Proeulia chrysopteris  (Butler, 1883) 
Proeulia clenchi  Clarke, 1980
Proeulia cneca  Obraztsov, 1964
Proeulia cnecona  Razowski, 1995
Proeulia domeykoi  Razowski & Pelz, 2010
Proeulia elguetae  Razowski, 1999
Proeulia exusta  (Butler, 1883) 
Proeulia gielisi  Razowski & Pelz, 2010
Proeulia gladiator  Razowski, 1999
Proeulia griseiceps  (Aurivillius, in Skottsberg, 1922) 
Proeulia guayacana  Razowski, 1999
Proeulia inconspicua  Obrazstov, 1964
Proeulia insperata  Razowski, 1995
Proeulia kuscheli  Clarke, 1980
Proeulia lentescens  Razowski, 1995
Proeulia leonina  (Butler, 1883) 
Proeulia limaria  Razowski & Pelz, 2010
Proeulia longula  Razowski & Pelz, 2010
Proeulia macrobasana  Razowski & Pelz, 2010
Proeulia mauleana  Razowski & Pelz, 2010
Proeulia nubleana  Razowski & Gonzlez, 2003
Proeulia onerata  Razowski, 1995
Proeulia paronerata  Razowski & Pelz, 2010
Proeulia robinsoni  (Aurivillius, in Skottsberg, 1922) 
Proeulia rucapillana  Razowski & Pelz, 2010
Proeulia schouteni  Razowski & Pelz, 2010
Proeulia sublentescens  Razowski & Pelz, 2010
Proeulia talcana  Razowski & Pelz, 2010
Proeulia tenontias  (Meyrick, 1912) 
Proeulia tricornuta  Razowski & Pelz, 2010
Proeulia triquetra  Obrazstov, 1964
Proeulia vanderwolfi  Razowski & Pelz, 2010

References

 , 1962, Proceedings of the Biological Society of Washington 75: 293.
 , 2005, World Catalogue of Insects 5
  2010: Tortricidae from Chile (Lepidoptera: Tortricidae). Shilap Revista de Lepidopterologia 38 (149): 5-55.

External links
tortricidae.com

 
Euliini
Tortricidae genera